Montellano is a city located in the province of Seville, Spain. According to the 2011 census (INE), the city has a population of 7,179 inhabitants.

References

Municipalities of the Province of Seville